Lani Jean Minella (born July 28, 1950) is an American voice actress, voice director, and producer mostly working in the games industry. She is also the founder and owner of the voice-acting agency, AudioGodz.

Career
After college, Minella started on Morning Drive radio for an alternative station in the late 1980s. After hearing her celebrity impersonations, GTE Interactive Media contacted her and asked her to imitate voices from the movie FernGully: The Last Rainforest, which was being pitched for a LaserDisc presentation to Magnavox and Philips. She was then referred by the company to their CD-Roms division, where she worked on more voices and assisted script writing on games for children. Minella asked the company if there were others doing similar work, and they suggested that she should go to trade shows, which led her to attend showcases like Consumer Electronics Show in Las Vegas, Game Developers Conference in San Jose, and Electronic Entertainment Expo in Los Angeles, where she gave out business cards but failed to get any offers. This led her to start her AudioGodz, a production company specializing in all aspects of voiceovers from talent to casting, directing, writing and production, in 1992.

In 1996, Minella worked on a major first-person shooter video game, Duke Nukem 3D, as voice director and actress, voicing most of the female characters in the series. She helped cast the voice actor of Duke Nukem, Jon St. John. She met Jon when she was cast as the voice for a commercial he was producing in San Diego. After being impressed by her voices, Jon imitated the voices back at Minella and she asked if he had ever done voice acting for video games. She shortly got him a telephone interview with the game's creator, George Broussard, and eventually got him the part of Duke.

Minella's first major voice role in a video game was for Her Interactive's adventure-mystery series Nancy Drew, starring as the titular character Nancy Drew, debuting with 1998's Secrets Can Kill. Minella reprised her role as Nancy Drew in 31 other video games, with her last being Sea of Darkness in 2015. Her Interactive's CEO then decided to find a voice actress local to the Seattle area (Minella resides in San Diego).

Since starting her career and becoming well known for her unique four-octave vocal range, Minella has provided voices for many voices for other characters in a variety of video games, including Rouge the Bat in the Sonic the Hedgehog series, Ivy Valentine in the Soulcalibur series, and Lucas in the Super Smash Bros. series.

Personal life
Minella is half Italian from her father's side. In her spare time, she does vocal coaching, gardening, and taking care of her rescue pets.

Filmography

Animation

Feature films

Video games

Podcast

References

External links
 
  – Minella's company website
 
 
 Lani Minella at Voice Chasers
 Lani Minella at MobyGames

1950 births
20th-century American actresses
21st-century American actresses
21st-century American businesspeople
American people of Italian descent
American video game actresses
American voice actresses
American casting directors
Women casting directors
Living people
Place of birth missing (living people)
American sound designers
Video game directors
Video game producers
American voice directors
21st-century American businesswomen